Nebria gregaria is a species of beetle in the family Carabidae. It is found in Alaska, United States and Aleutian Islands.

References

Further reading

 

gregaria
Beetles described in 1820
Taxa named by Gotthelf Fischer von Waldheim